There are approximately 16,000 operational desalination plants, located across 177 countries, which generate an estimated 95 million m3/day of fresh water. Micro desalination plants operate near almost every natural gas or fracking facility in the United States. Furthermore, micro desalination facilities exist in textile, leather, food industries, etc.

Operating Desalination Plants

The following table is a list of operating desalination plants. Criteria for inclusion on this list include:
 that it's operating (not proposed or decommissioned), and
 has a capacity of at least 100,000 cubic meters per day or it's the largest in its country.
 excludes desalination plants used primarily for mining etc

Algeria
Algeria is believed to have at least 15 desalination plants in operation.

Arzew IWPP Power & Desalination Plant, Arzew, 90,000m3/day
Cap Djinet Seawater Reverse Osmosis 100,000 m3/day
Tlemcen Souk Tleta 200,000 m3/day
Tlemcen Hounaine 200,000 m3/day
Beni Saf 200,000 m3/day
Tenes 200,000 m3/day
Fouka 120,000 m3/day
Tipaza 100,000 m3/day
Skikda 100,000 m3/day
Hamma Seawater Desalination Plant 200,000 m3/day built by General Electric
Mostaganem, (Sonaghter) 200,000 m3/day
Magtaa Reverse Osmosis (RO) Desalination Plant 500,000 m3/day, Oran

Aruba

Australia

The Millennium Drought (1997–2009) led to a water supply crisis across much of the country. A combination of increased water usage and lower rainfall/drought in Australia caused state governments to turn to desalination. As a result, several large-scale desalination plants were constructed (see list).

Large-scale seawater reverse osmosis plants (SWRO) now contribute to the domestic water supplies of several major Australian cities including Adelaide, Melbourne, Sydney, Perth and the Gold Coast. While desalination helped secure water supplies, it is energy intensive (≈$140/ML). In 2010, a Seawater Greenhouse went into operation in Port Augusta.

A growing number of smaller scale SWRO plants are used by the oil and gas industry (both on and offshore), by mining companies to supply slurry pipelines for the transport of ore and on offshore islands to supply tourists and residents.

Bahrain
The Al Hidd distillate forwarding station provides 410 million liters of distillate water storage in a series of 45-million-liter steel tanks. A 135-million-liters/day forwarding pumping station sends flows to the Hidd, Muharraq, Hoora, Sanabis, and Seef blending stations, and which has an option for gravity supply for low flows to blending pumps and pumps which forward to Janusan, Budiya and Saar.

Upon completion of the third construction phase, the Durrat Al Bahrain seawater reverse osmosis (SWRO) desalination plant was planned to have a capacity of 36,000 cubic meters of potable water per day to serve the irrigation needs of the Durrat Al Bahrain development. The Bahrain-based utility company, Energy Central Co contracted to design, build and operate the plant.

Barbados 
In 1994–1995 the island of Barbados experienced a severe 1 in 50 year severe drought that knocked much of the island's drinking water supply offline including the country's sole major hospital in the capital-city Bridgetown. An agreement was negotiated with General Electric's Ionics Inc. to build a reverse osmosis desalination plant on the south western coast of the island capable of supplying 20% of the islands population. The plant began operating within 15 months and was officially commissioned February 2000. Currently many cruise ships purchase water from Barbados due to its good quality.

Cayman Islands
West Bay, West Bay, Grand Cayman
Abel Castillo Water Works, Governor's Harbour, Grand Cayman
Britannia, Seven Mile Beach, Grand Cayman

Chile
Copiapó Desalination Plant 
Thorium Power Canada, with its affiliate, DBI Chile, have proposed plans to build a 10 MW demonstration thorium reactor in Chile to power the 20 million litre/day desalination plant. All land and regulatory approvals are currently in process.

China
China operates the Beijing Desalination Plant in Tianjin, a combination desalination and coal-fired power plant designed to alleviate Tianjin's critical water shortage. Though the facility has the capacity to produce 200,000 cubic meters of potable water per day, it has never operated at more than one-quarter capacity due to difficulties with local utility companies and an inadequate local infrastructure.

The Hong Kong Water Supplies Department had pilot desalination plants in Tuen Mun and Ap Lei Chau using reverse-osmosis technology. The production cost was put at HK$7.8 to HK$8.4 /m3. Hong Kong used to have a desalination plant in Lok On Pai, Siu Lam.

In 2014, the government confirmed the reservation of a 10-hectare site at Tseung Kwan O for the construction of a reverse-osmosis desalination plant with an initial output capacity of 50 million cubic metres per annum. Plans include provisions for future expansion to an ultimate capacity of 90 million cubic metres per annum, which will meet about 10 per cent of Hong Kong's fresh water demand. Detailed feasibility studies, preliminary design and a cost-effectiveness analysis are planned to be completed by 2014. A commissioning date of 2020 is envisaged.

Cyprus
A plant operates in Cyprus near the town of Larnaca. The Dhekelia Desalination Plant uses the reverse osmosis system.

Egypt
Dahab  Desalination Plants Dahab 3,600 m3/day completed 1999. The facility in the South Sinai is being expanded to produce 15,000 m3/day
Hurgada and Sharm El-Sheikh Power and Desalination Plants
Oyoun Moussa Power and Desalination
Zaafarana Power and Desalination
Remelah Desalination Plant

As of May 2022, Egypt had a total of 82 desalination plants with a combined capacity of 917,000 cubic meters per day.

Germany
Fresh water on the island of Helgoland is supplied by two reverse osmosis desalination plants.

Gibraltar
Fresh water in Gibraltar is supplied by a number of reverse osmosis and multistage flash desalination plants. A demonstration forward osmosis desalination plant also operates there.

India
India has two desalinization plants, the Minjur Seawater Desalination Plant and the Nemmeli plant, both in Chennai.

Iran
An assumption is that around 400,000 m3/d of historic and newly installed capacity is operational in Iran. In terms of technology, Iran's existing desalination plants use a mix of thermal processes and RO. MSF is the most widely used thermal technology although MED and vapour compression (VC) also feature.

Israel
Israel Desalination Enterprises' Sorek Desalination Plant north of Palmachim was foreseen to provide up to 26,000 m³ of potable water per hour once it went online in June 2013 (that is ca. 228 million m³ when projected on an entire year). Once unthinkable, given Israel's history of drought and lack of available fresh water resources, with desalination Israel can now produce a surplus of fresh water.

The Hadera seawater reverse osmosis (SWRO) desalination plant in Israel is the largest seawater desalination plant in the world. The project was developed as a build–operate–transfer by a consortium of two Israeli companies: Shikun and Binui, and IDE Technologies.

By 2014, Israel's desalination programs provided roughly 35% of Israel's drinking water, about 50% in 2015, and it is expected to supply 70% by 2050. As of May 29, 2015 more than 50 percent of the water for Israeli households, agriculture and industry is artificially produced.

Additional desalination plants supply the entire freshwater needs of the city of Eilat by desalinating a mix of brackish well water and seawater. Similar plants exist in the Arava and the southern coastal plain of the Carmel range.

Kazakhstan 
MAEK-Kazatomprom LLP operates sea water desalination plant in Aktau, Mangystau from 1967. Now its power comes to 74,000 m3/day. Earlier it was a part of combined combinate with Nuclear plant and gas electric power stations. Also in Aktau there is membrane technology water desalination plant Kaspiy, which power comes to 20,000 m3/day

Kuwait 
Kuwait does not have any permanent rivers. It does have some wadis, the most notable of which is Wadi Al-Batin which forms the border between Kuwait and Iraq.

Kuwait relies on water desalination as a primary source of fresh water for drinking and domestic purposes. There are currently more than six desalination plants. Kuwait was the first country in the world to use desalination to supply water for large-scale domestic use. The history of desalination in Kuwait dates back to 1951 when the first distillation plant was commissioned.

Malta 
Ghar Lapsi II 50,000 m3/day

Maldives
Maldives is a nation of small islands. Some depend on desalination as a source of water.

Mexico
The first desalination plant in Mexico was built in 1960 and had a capacity of 27,648 m3/day.

As of 2006, there were 435 desalination plants in Mexico with a total capacity of 311,700 m3/day.

One of the world's largest desalination plants (380,160 m3/day) is planned for Rosarito.

Morocco 
There are multiple desalination projects ongoing in Morocco, mostly desalinating seawater from the Atlantic Ocean.

Norway
Norway is a country with little to no problems with water access. Over 99% of the population's water supply comes from fresh water sources such as lakes, tarns, rivers and ground water. There are however three water works in Norway taking use of desalination of sea water and all of them are located in the county of Nordland, only providing around 500 people with water.

Oman
A pilot seawater greenhouse was built in 2004 near Muscat, in collaboration with Sultan Qaboos University, providing a sustainable horticultural sector on the Batinah coast.
 Ghubrah Power & Desalination Plant, Muscat
 Sohar Power & Desalination Plant, Sohar
 Sur R.O. Desalination Plant 80,000 m3/day 2009
 Qarn Alam 1,000 m3/day
 Wilayat Diba 2,000 m3/day

There are at least two forward osmosis plants operating in Oman
 Al Najdah 200 m3/day (built by Modern Water)
 Al Khaluf

Palestine

Pakistan 
A water desalination plant was recently inaugurated by Pakistan's Minister for Ports and Shipping at the port city of Gwader on 01 Jan, 2018.  This is one of the biggest of its kind plant in Pakistan. On the inauguration day the Pakistan's Minister for Ports and Shipping said in his address,

To drive this point home, he mentioned that this plant (which can hold 5 million gallons of water) will provide 254,000 gallons of clean potable drinking water per day – at Rs. 0.8 per gallon.

Qatar

 Ras Abu Fontas (RAF) A2 – 160,000  m3/day. The country has plans for two plants with an additional 735,000  m3/ day

Saudi Arabia
The Saline Water Conversion Corporation of Saudi Arabia provides 50% of the municipal water in the Kingdom, operates a number of desalination plants, and has contracted $1.892 billion to a Japanese-South Korean consortium to build a new facility capable of producing a billion liters per day, opening at the end of 2013. They currently operate 32 plants in the Kingdom; one example at Shoaiba cost $1.06 billion and produces 450 million liters per day.

Corniche RO Plant (Crop) (operated by SAWACO)
Jubail 1,400,000 m3/day
North Obhor Plant (operated by SAWACO)
Rabigh 7,000 m3/day (operated by wetico)
planned for completion 2018 Rabigh II 600,000 m3/day (under construction Saline Water Conversion Corporation)
Ras Al-Khair Power and Desalination Plant (operated by Saline Water Conversion Corporation) A hybrid plant serving Riyadh constructed in 2014, and producing 1,036,000 m3/day of water and 2,400MW of electricity.
Shuaibah III 150,000 m3/day (operated by Doosan)
South Jeddah Corniche Plant (SOJECO) (operated by SAWACO)
Yanbu Multi Effect Distillation (MED), Saudi Arabia 146,160  m3/day

Singapore
Desalinated water is planned to meet 30% of Singapore's future water needs by 2060.

Existing (25% of Singapore's 2017 water demand)
SingSpring, Tuas (2005) – 30 million imperial gallons (mgd) / 136,380 m3/day @ 3.5kWh/m3
Sungei Tampines (2007) – 4,000 m3/day, small scale variable salinity desalination.
Tuas South, Tuas (2013) – 70 million imperial gallons (mgd) / 318,500 m3/day @ integrated with a 411 MW on-site combined cycle gas turbine power plant
Tuas (2017) – 137,000 m3/day
Marina East (2020) – 30 million imperial gallons (mgd) / 137,000 m3/day. World's first full scale variable salinity plant capable of treating both river water and seawater.
Jurong Island (2022) – 30 million imperial gallons (mgd) / 137,000 m3/day. Located next to an existing power plant

Spain
Lanzarote is the easternmost of the autonomous Canary Islands, which are of volcanic origin. It is the closest of the islands to the Sahara desert and therefore the driest, and it has limited water supplies. A private, commercial desalination plant was installed in 1964 to serve the whole island and enable the tourism industry. In 1974, the venture was injected with investments from local and municipal governments, and a larger infrastructure was put in place in 1989, the Lanzarote Island Waters Consortium (INALSA) was formed.

A prototype seawater greenhouse was constructed in Tenerife in 1992.

Alicante II 65,000 m3/day (operator Inima)
Tordera 60,000 m3/day
Barcelona 200,000 m3/day (operator Degremont) El Prat, near Barcelona, a desalination plant completed in 2009 was meant to provide water to the Barcelona metropolitan area, especially during the periodic severe droughts that put the available amounts of drinking water under serious stress.
Oropesa 50,000 m3/day (operator Técnicas Reunidas)
Moncofa 60,000 m3/day (operator Inima)
Marina Baja – Mutxamel 50,000 m3/day (operator Degremont)
Torrevieja 240,000 m3/day (operator Acciona)
Cartagena Escombreras 63,000 m3/day (operator Cobra | Tedagua)
Edam Ibiza + Edam San Antonio 25,000 m3/day (operator Ibiza – Portmany)
Mazarron 36,000 m3/day (operator Tedagua)
Bajo Almanzora 65,000 m3/day

South Africa
Mossel Bay 15,000 m3/day
Transnet Saldanha 2,400 m3/day
Knysna 2,000 m3/day
Plettenberg Bay 2,000 m3/day
Bushman's River Mouth 1,800 m3/day
Lambert's Bay 1,700 m3/day 
Cannon Rocks 750 m3/day

Sweden 
Sweden has two desalination plants for brackish water from the Baltic sea, one built 2016 in Herrvik on the island of Gotland with a capacity to produce 480 m3/day, and another one with a capacity of 7 500 m3/day in Kvarnåkershamn on the same island.

Taiwan 
In February 2021 a desalination plant with a daily capacity of 13000 tons was built as an answer to a water emergency. The plant supposed to support semiconductor production in greater Hscinchu area from Nanliao.

Trinidad and Tobago 
The Republic of Trinidad and Tobago uses desalination to open up more of the island's water supply for drinking purposes. The country's desalination plant, opened in March 2003, is considered to be the first of its kind. It was the largest desalination facility in the Americas, and it processes  of water a day at the price of $2.67 per .

This plant will be located at Trinidad's Point Lisas Industrial Estate, a park of more than 12 companies in various manufacturing and processing functions, and it will allow for easy access to water for both factories and residents in the country.

United Arab Emirates
The majority of desalination facilities in the Emirates are overseen by the Sharjah Electricity and Water Authority (SEWA).

The Jebel Ali desalination plant in Dubai, a dual-purpose facility, uses multistage flash distillation and is capable of producing 300 million cubic meters of water per year. 
 Kalba 15,000 m3/day built for Sharjah Electricity and Water Authority completed 2010 (operator CH2MHill)
 Khor Fakkan 22,500 m3/day (operator CH2MHill)
 Ghalilah RAK 68,000 m3/day (operator Aquatech)
 Hamriyah 90,000 m3/day (operator Aqua Engineering)
When completed, it is expected to raise the Emirates water produced by RO to 30%.
 Al Zawrah 27,000 m3/day (operator Aqua Engineering)
 Layyah I 22,500 m3/day (operator CH2MHill)
 Emayil & Saydiat Island ≈20,000 m3/day (operator Aqua EPC)
 Umm Al Nar Desalination Plant has an output of /day.
 Al Yasat Al Soghrih Island 2M gallons per day (GPD) or 9,000 m3/day
 Fujairah F2 is an Integrated water and power plant (IWPP) facility with RO, thermal, and power generation components. Its total capacity is 591,500m3 of which 136,500m3 is RO and 450,000m3 is thermal as well as 2,000MW of electricity.
 A seawater greenhouse was constructed on Al-Aryam Island, Abu Dhabi, United Arab Emirates in 2000.

United Kingdom and Crown dependencies
The first large-scale plant in the United Kingdom, the Thames Water Desalination Plant, was built in Beckton, east London for Thames Water by Acciona Agua. It was built in 2010 at a cost of £250m.  The plant provides up to 150 million litres of drinking water each day (150,000 cubic metres) – enough for nearly one million people.

Jersey 
The desalination plant located near La Rosière, La Corbière, Jersey, is operated by Jersey Water. Built in 1970 in an abandoned quarry, it was the first in the British Isles.

The original plant used a multistage flash (MSF) distillation process, whereby seawater was boiled under vacuum, evaporated and condensed into a freshwater distillate. In 1997, the MSF plant reached the end of its operational life and was replaced with a modern reverse osmosis plant.

Its maximum power demand is 1,750 kW, and the output capacity is 6,000 cubic meters per day. Specific energy consumption is 6.8 kWh/m3.

United States

Texas
There are a dozen different desalination projects in the state of Texas, both for desalinating groundwater and desalinating seawater from the Gulf of Mexico.  However, currently there are no seawater desalination plants earmarked for municipal purposes.

 El Paso: Brackish groundwater has been treated at the El Paso, Texas, plant since around 2004. It produces  of fresh water daily (about 25% of total freshwater deliveries) by reverse osmosis. The plant's water costlargely representing the cost of energyis about 2.1 times higher than ordinary groundwater production.

California
California has 17 desalination plants in the works, either partially constructed or through exploration and planning phases. The list of locations includes Bay Point, in the Delta, Redwood City, seven in the Santa Cruz / Monterey Bay, Cambria, Oceaneo, Redondo Beach, Huntington Beach, Dana Point, Camp Pendleton, Oceanside and Carlsbad.

 Carlsbad: The Claude "Bud" Lewis Carlsbad Desalination Plant was constructed at a cost of $1 billion by Poseidon Resources and was the largest desalination plant in the United States when it went online December 14, 2015. It produces 50 million gallons a day to 110,000 customers throughout San Diego County.
 Concord: Planned to open in 2020, producing 20 million gallons a day.
 Monterey County: Sand City, two miles north of Monterey, with a population of 334, is the only city in California completely supplied with water from a desalination plant.
Santa Barbara: The Charles Meyer Desalination Facility was constructed in Santa Barbara, California, in 1991–92 as a temporary emergency water supply in response to severe drought. While it has a high operating cost, the facility only needs to operate infrequently, allowing Santa Barbara to use its other supplies more extensively. The plant was re-activated in the spring of 2017.

Florida

In 1977, Cape Coral, Florida became the first municipality in the United States to use the RO process on a large scale with an initial operating capacity of 3 million gallons per day. By 1985, due to the rapid growth in population of Cape Coral, the city had the largest low pressure reverse osmosis plant in the world, capable of producing 15 MGD.

As of 2012, South Florida has 33 brackish and two seawater desalination plants operating with seven brackish water plants under construction. The brackish and seawater desalination plants have the capacity to produce 245 million gallons of potable water per day.

The Tampa Bay Water desalination project near Tampa, Florida, was originally a private venture led by Poseidon Resources, but it was delayed by the bankruptcy of Poseidon Resources' successive partners in the venture, Stone & Webster, then Covanta (formerly Ogden) and its principal subcontractor, Hydroanautics. Stone & Webster declared bankruptcy June 2000. Covanta and Hydranautics joined in 2001, but Covanta failed to complete the construction bonding, and then the Tampa Bay Water agency purchased the project on May 15, 2002, underwriting the project. Tampa Bay Water then contracted with Covanta Tampa Construction, which produced a project that failed performance tests. After its parent went bankrupt, Covanta also filed for bankruptcy prior to performing renovations that would have satisfied contractual agreements. This resulted in nearly six months of litigation. In 2004, Tampa Bay Water hired a renovation team, American Water/Acciona Aqua, to bring the plant to its original, anticipated design.

Arizona
 Yuma: The desalination plant in Yuma, Arizona, was constructed under authority of the state Colorado River Basin Salinity Control Act of 1974 to treat saline agricultural return flows from the Wellton-Mohawk Irrigation and Drainage District into the Colorado River. The treated water is intended for inclusion in water deliveries to Mexico, thereby keeping a like amount of freshwater in Lake Mead, Arizona and Nevada. Construction of the plant was completed in 1992, and it has operated on two occasions since then. With a full capacity of 73 million gallons per day of permeate water, it is the largest desalination plant in the US. The plant has been maintained, but largely not operated due to sufficient freshwater supplies from the upper Colorado River. An agreement was reached in April 2010 between the Southern Nevada Water Authority, the Metropolitan Water District of Southern California, the Central Arizona Project, and the U.S. Bureau of Reclamation to underwrite the cost of running the plant in a year-long pilot project.

References 

Water desalination
Water supply infrastructure by country